The Brookneal/Campbell County Airport (FAA 0V4) is a public airport located  northwest of Brookneal, in Campbell County, Virginia, USA. Established in 1978 as a joint effort between Campbell County and the Town of Brookneal, the facility serves primarily general aviation.

References

External links 

Airports in Virginia
Transportation in Campbell County, Virginia
Buildings and structures in Campbell County, Virginia